"Love Hurts" is the twentieth episode of the first season of House, which premiered on the Fox network on May 10, 2005.

Plot
Harvey Park is at the hospital to figure out why he grinds his teeth. Dr. Gregory House is talking with one of his patients and Dr. James Wilson about agreeing to go on a date with Dr. Allison Cameron. After being aggravated by their responses about what he should do, House chews out Park for spilling urine onto his jacket. When he discovers the liquid was just apple juice, he goes to apologize to Park, only to find him in the middle of a stroke.

When House gets the team together, he states that they need to be clever on this particular case due to the fact that Park has a metal plate in his jaw, giving them the inability to perform an MRI. Dr. Eric Foreman goes into Park's room to discuss his current situation with him, to find him experiencing a little nominal aphasia.

The team discovers Park's friend, Annette Raines, is actually a paid dominatrix. Dr. Lisa Cuddy talks with House about Dr. Cameron, giving him input on what he should wear. Dr. Robert Chase meets with Park, who is distraught about his feelings for Annette and not wanting surgery. Annette returns to the hospital to change Park's mind about the surgery and is almost struck by him after he has another attack.

House gets Park's estranged parents to the hospital only by telling them he is dead, and they eventually give their consent for his surgery. Later that night, House and Dr. Cameron go on their date and House expresses his feelings to her. The next morning, the team discovers that Park has fulminating osteomyelitis, in which the infected tissue of his jaw broke off, blocking blood flow to the brain but it was hidden from the scans by Harvey's metal plate. Later that evening, House goes to talk to both Annette and Park about how they need to stop their activity. Park asks House if his parents came to see him. House leaves the room speechless.

Production
This episode was written by series creator David Shore and was directed by Bryan Spicer.

Reception
The episode was first broadcast in the United States on Fox on May 10, 2005. The episode was seen by 18.80 million viewers, making House the 10th most-watched program of that week.

External links

 "Love Hurts" at Fox.com
 

House (season 1) episodes
2005 American television episodes